Porrittia is a genus of moths in the family Pterophoridae.

Species
Porrittia galactodactyla (Denis & Schiffermüller, 1775)
Porrittia herzi Ustjuzhanin, 2001
Porrittia imbecilla (Meyrick, 1925)

Pterophorini
Moth genera
Taxa named by J. W. Tutt